Colm Judge (born in Drogheda) is an Irish sportsperson. He plays Gaelic football with his local club Newtown Blues and has been a member of the Louth senior inter-county team since 2006. Judge is regarded as one of Louth's top GAA players. He was part of the Louth team that played in the final of the Leinster Senior Football Championship in 2010, but were beaten in controversial circumstances by Meath. He helped Louth to win both Tommy Murphy Cup and National League Div 2 tiles in 2006 and also National League Div 3 title in 2011.
He is the son of former Louth footballer Eugene Judge.

At club level he won a Louth Senior Football Championship in 2008 & 2013 with Newtown Blues.

References

External links 
 
 http://www.irishexaminer.com/sport/gaa/judge-axed-by-louth-157557.html

Year of birth missing (living people)
Living people
Louth inter-county Gaelic footballers
Newtown Blues Gaelic footballers